Étréham is a commune in the Calvados department in the Normandy region in northwestern 
France.

Toponymy 
Oesterham in 1350.

Probably Old Saxon *wester or Old English westre related to "west" (Old High German westar, west-; see Westerham, Kent) and hām "home, hamlet" or, less probably, Old Saxon ōstar related to "east" (see Ouistreham). This place name corresponds to Saxon settlements in Bayeux and in the surrounding Bessin Region (the so-called Otlinga Saxonia) in the 5 - 6th century or to Anglo-Scandinavian settlements later in the 10th.

History

World War II
The village was bombed on 8 June 1944, two days after the D-Day landings, by the Big Red One (U.S. First Division). It was liberated one day later, and about 600 German soldiers were taken prisoner. After the liberation, the Allies used the place called Mont Cauvin in the same commune to store their oil until the conquest of Cherbourg.

Population

See also
Communes of the Calvados department

References

Communes of Calvados (department)
Calvados communes articles needing translation from French Wikipedia